Peter Martin (born 1970) is an American jazz pianist.

Life and career
Martin was born in St. Louis, Missouri on August 17, 1970. He won Second Place at the 1993 Thelonious Monk International Jazz Piano Competition.

Producer Carl Griffin brought Martin together with saxophonist Ron Blake, bassist Rodney Whitaker, and drummer Gregory Hutchinson to form the band 4-Sight, which released one eponymous album for N2K Encoded Music in 1998.

Martin is musical director and pianist for Dianne Reeves and arranged and played music for her Grammy Award-winning soundtrack to the motion picture Good Night, and Good Luck. He also appeared in the film.

In September 2008 he was appointed lecturer in jazz studies at the Bienen School of Music at Northwestern University. He has also been on the music faculty at Tulane University, the University of New Orleans and New Orleans Center for Creative Arts.

Martin has been a member of Chris Botti's touring band and in 2009 toured extensively with Christian McBride. He has recorded with Victor Goines, Johnny Griffin, Wynton Marsalis, Nicholas Payton, Joshua Redman, Dianne Reeves and Rodney Whitaker. Other artists with whom he has performed include Terence Blanchard, Betty Carter, Roy Hargrove, Ellis Marsalis, Christian McBride, David Sanborn and Stanley Turrentine.

Martin has released two albums on the Max Jazz label, Something Unexpected (2001) and In The P.M. (2005). In 2009, Martin released his first solo CD, Set of Five on his own label, Peter Martin Music produced by Dan Martin.

In October 2015, Martin released an album, What Lies Ahead, on Open Studio Records, featuring his trio of Reuben Rogers, bass and Gregory Hutchinson, drums and special guests Vocalists Erin Bode, and Brian Owens produced by Dan Martin. It was recorded in his home town of St. Louis.

In January 2011, Martin played at the White House as part of the State Dinner the President Obama held welcoming the president of China.

In 2016, Martin won a Grammy Award for his performance in Steve Reich.

After launching an educational video podcast, 2-Minute Jazz, Martin launched a website, Open Studio, in 2011 that is a members-only jazz lesson site with video lessons and online master classes containing premium concepts and content. Students from over 100 countries have joined and are continuing to learn from Martin, Dianne Reeves, Christian McBride, Greg Hutchinson, Romero Lubambo and other artists.

References

External links
Official Home Page

Living people
1970 births
American jazz pianists
American male pianists
21st-century American pianists
21st-century American male musicians
American male jazz musicians
Varèse Sarabande Records artists